William R. Gill, a career member of the US Foreign Service, was named Deputy Chief of Mission (DCM) in Azerbaijan in 2016.  He has since been named US Chargé d'Affaires, a.i.

Education
Gill majored in history at the College of William & Mary.

Career
Gill joined the Foreign Service in 1995. He served as U.S. Consul in Milan, Italy (2007 to 2011) and Beirut, Lebanon (2005 to 2007).  While in Lebanon, he coordinated the evacuation of 15,000 Americans during the July-August 2006 war.

References

College of William & Mary alumni
African-American diplomats
Ambassadors of the United States to Azerbaijan
American consuls
Year of birth missing (living people)
Living people